Tallman House may refer to:

in the United States
(by state then town)
Horace M. Tallman House, Shelbyville, Illinois, listed on the NRHP in Shelby County
Tallman-Vanderbeck House, Closter, New Jersey, listed on the NRHP in Bergen County, New Jersey
Holmes–Tallman House, Monroe Township, New Jersey, listed on the NRHP in Middlesex County
MacGregor-Tallman House, West Long Branch, New Jersey, listed on the NRHP in Monmouth County
Lincoln-Tallman House, Janesville, Wisconsin, listed on the NRHP in Rock County